Scarffe's Crossing (Manx: Crossag Scarroo) is a diminutive and little-used request stop on the Manx Electric Railway on the Isle of Man

Location

The halt is located off the main Douglas to Laxey road and is positioned on a farm crossing providing resident access only. It is one of many rural request stops along the line still known by their colloquial name (usually named after the farmer who farms nearby)

Facilities

Until 1999 the stop never had an "official" stop board in place. Despite being unofficially named the halt has a simple bus stop-type sign affixed to the overhead pole.

Also
Manx Electric Railway Stations

References

Sources
 Manx Manx Electric Railway Stopping Places (2002) Manx Electric Railway Society
 Island Island Images: Manx Electric Railway Pages (2003) Jon Wornham
 Official Official Tourist Department Page (2009) Isle of Man Heritage Railways

Railway stations in the Isle of Man
Manx Electric Railway
Railway stations opened in 1894